Jili (Lijili) is a Plateau language of Nigeria. It is one of several languages which go by the ambiguous name Koro.

Due to 19th-century slave raids, Jili speakers are scattered across different areas of central Nigeria.

References

Languages of Nigeria
South Plateau languages